WD repeat-containing protein 11 (WDR11) also known as bromodomain and WD repeat-containing protein 2 (BRWD2) is a protein that in humans is encoded by the WDR11 gene.

Function 

This gene encodes a member of the WD repeat protein family. WD repeats are minimally conserved regions of approximately 40 amino acids typically bracketed by gly-his and trp-asp (GH-WD), which may facilitate formation of heterotrimeric or multiprotein complexes. WDR11 has been shown to be part of a trimer with FAM91A1 (Family With Sequence Similarity 91 Member A1) and C17orf75, as elicited through immunoprecipitation, fractionation, and mass spectrometry. This trimer has been proposed to promote the Golgi’s capture of vesicles. Members of this family are involved in a variety of cellular processes, including cell cycle progression, signal transduction, apoptosis, and gene regulation.

Clinical significance 

This gene is located in the chromosome 10q25-26 region, which is frequently deleted in gliomas and tumors of other tissues, and is disrupted by the t(10;19) translocation rearrangement in glioblastoma cells. The gene location suggests that it is a candidate gene for the tumor suppressor locus.

References

Further reading